The Mazatlan sole (Achirus mazatlanus) is a sole of the genus Achirus native to the eastern Pacific from northern Baja California and the Gulf of California to northernmost Peru. It is found at depths of 1–60 m in coastal lagoons and fresh water. Its diet consists of crustaceans, small fishes, polychaetes, and occasionally detritus.

References

Mazatlan sole
Fauna of the Baja California Peninsula
Fish of Mexican Pacific coast
Fish of Colombia
Fish of Ecuador
Fish of Nicaragua
Mazatlan sole